The Denton Schoolhouse is a historic school located at Denton, Caroline County, Maryland, United States. It is a small building with a Latin cross plan and several features of the Gothic Revival style, built about 1883. On the roof ridge is an octagonal cupola with a belfry of alternating louvered and plain drop-arched panels, with a cut wooden spire on top.

The Denton Schoolhouse was listed on the National Register of Historic Places in 1978.

References

External links
, including photo from 1996, at Maryland Historical Trust

Denton, Maryland
School buildings on the National Register of Historic Places in Maryland
Gothic Revival architecture in Maryland
School buildings completed in 1883
Buildings and structures in Caroline County, Maryland
National Register of Historic Places in Caroline County, Maryland